Love Is Blind is a 2005 Indian Gujarati film directed by Vipul Sharma, starring Sandeep Patel and Sonali Kulkarni. It was the first Gujarati film released in the multiplexes. The film narrates a love story of Anand (Patel), a blind violin player, and Amisha (Kulkarni), a writer. It won eleven of the Gujarat State Film Awards in 2005-06, including the Best Film Award and the Best Director Award.

Plot
Anand (Patel) is a violin player who suffers greatly due to his blindness. He can't accept his father's second marriage and lives separately since the young age due to estrangement with his step-mother. Once, he becomes the victim of Amisha (Kulkarni), a writer's anger because of his blindness. When Amisha knows the reality, her sympathy turns into love gradually. When Amisha's family members know about their relationship, they become angry on her. But her grandfather (Pandit) takes her side always. When Anand goes to Amisha's home with a marriage proposal, he is rusticated from the home and being called blind. To revenge it, Anand boozes with his friends ad creates commotion, and speaks swear words at Amisha's home. Thus Anand and Amisha are separated. Anand doesn't marry a girl suggested by his step-mother and suffers in Amisha's separation. He elopes with Amisha with his friends on the very day of Amisha's marriage.

Cast
Sonali Kulkarni as Amisha
Sandeep Patel as Anand
Sudha Chandran
Devendra Pandit
Mehul Buch
Hasmuk Bhavsar
Jyotin Dave
Bimal Trivedi 
Zalak Thakkar
Tushar Dave
Pragnya Trivedi
Baby Tarika
Mayur Vakani

Production
It was shot in 27 days at various locations including in Mumbai and at Adalaj Stepwell and Sun Temple, Modhera. Kulkarni learned Gujarati under Trishala Patel.

Music
The music was composed by Kardam Thakar. It featured songs like "Bandh Aankhoma", "Prem Pyar Ishq Ke Asashiqi Kaho", "Love Is Blind" and "O Mara Saathi Tu Gaa".

Release
Love Is Blind was the first Gujarati film released in the multiplexes.

Accolades 
The film won eleven of the Gujarat state film awards of 2005-06 instituted by the Government of Gujarat, including the Best Film. Sharma received the Best Director award.

References

2005 films
2000s Gujarati-language films
Indian romantic drama films
Films about blind people in India
Films shot in Gujarat
Films set in Gujarat